Welcome Stranger is the debut studio album by The Blackeyed Susans. Released in August, 1992, the album is a compilation of their first three EPs – Some Births Are Worse Than Murders, Anchor Me and …Depends On What You Mean By Love – with the addition of three tracks recorded at the same time as the material released on those EPs.

Track listing 

 "Don’t Call Yourself An Angel" (McComb, Kakulas) – 3:14
 "Enemy Mine" (McComb, Kakulas) – 4:07
 "Viva Las Vegas" (Doc Pomus, Mort Shuman) – 5:10
 "Cripple Creek" (Traditional/Kakulas) – 4:47
 "Glory Glory" (Kakulas) – 4:03
 "Anchor Me" (Snarski) – 2:43
 "Who’s That By The Window?" (Kakulas) – 2:50
 "Trouble" (Kakulas, Rollinson) – 4:13
 "Ocean of You" (McComb) – 3:33
 "Close Watch" (John Cale) – 2:59
 "Will’s Blues" (Akers) – 3:22
 "Spanish Is The Loving Tongue" (Traditional) – 2:59
 "Who’s Loving You" (Robinson) – 3:08
 "It Hurts Me" (Byers, Daniels)/"Prisoner of Love" (Robin, Columbo, Gaskill) – 3:42
 "In The Pines" (McComb) – 3:44

Personnel

Tracks 1–4 
 David McComb – vocals, guitar, percussion
 Rob Snarski – vocals, guitar
 Phil Kakulas – double bass, electric bass, bazouki, guitar, backing vocals, percussion
 Alsy MacDonald – drums, percussion
 Ross Bolleter – hammond organ, piano, piano organ
 William Akers – backing vocals

Tracks 5–8 and 15 
 Rob Snarski – vocals, acoustic guitar
 Kathryn Wemyss – vocals, trumpet, castanets
 Phillip Kakulas – double bass
 Timothy Rollinson – electric guitar
 Kenny Davis Junior – piano, piano accordion
 James Cruikshank – organ
 Graham Lee – pedal steel
 Mark Dawson – percussion

Tracks 9–14 
 Rob Snarski – vocals
 Kenny Davis Junior – keyboards, piano accordion, samples
 David McComb – keyboards, bass, electric and acoustic guitars, backing vocals
 Joanne Alach – backing vocals

External links

The Blackeyed Susans albums
1992 debut albums